The 7th Gujarat Legislative Assembly election was held in 1985. The incumbent Indian National Congress (INC) obtained majority with an increase in the vote share and number of seats which was a record in terms of number of seats. INC won 149 seats out of total 182 seats. Janata Party (JP) won only 14 seats, showcasing dominance of INC at that time. This was the best ever electoral performance of INC in Gujarat and their record of 149 seats was surpassed only by Bharatiya Janata Party (BJP) in 2022 elections. 1985 election remains the most recent election in Gujarat in which Indian National Congress won a majority in Gujarat Assembly as its support and vote bank was heavily declined by the rise of BJP

Results

Elected members

References 

State Assembly elections in Gujarat
1980s in Gujarat
Gujarat